Hypostomus regani is a species of catfish in the family Loricariidae. It is native to South America, where it occurs in the basins of the Paraná River, the Paraguay River, and the Uruguay River. The species reaches 41 cm (16.1 inches) SL and is believed to be a facultative air-breather.

H. regani appears in the aquarium trade, where it is typically known as the giant white-spot pleco.

References 

Hypostominae
Fish described in 1905